Telphusa cistiflorella is a moth of the family Gelechiidae. It is found on the Canary Islands, Sardinia and Crete, as well as in Portugal, Spain, France, Italy and Greece.

The wingspan is 12–15 mm.

The larvae feed on the flowers of Cistus albidus.

References

Moths described in 1890
Telphusa